is a 1999 Japanese OVA produced by Animate Film and animated by Radix. It ran for six episodes and is the second OVA based on the Sakura Wars video games. The episodes were released in VHS, LaserDisc and DVD formats.

It was licensed in North America by ADV Films under the name Sakura Wars: Return of the Spirit Warriors.

Overview
The episodes are six character study episodes about the Imperial Assault Force, taking place during the first two video games.

Theme songs
Openings

Lyricist: Ouji Hiroi / Composer: Kohei Tanaka / Arranger: Takayuki Negishi / Singers: Chisa Yokoyama, Michie Tomizawa, Urara Takano
Episodes: 1, 3, 5

Lyricist: Ouji Hiroi / Composer: Kohei Tanaka / Arranger: Takayuki Negishi / Singers: Yuriko Fuchizaki, Kumiko Nishihara, Mayumi Tanaka
Episodes: 2, 4, 6

Episodes

References

External links

Sakura Wars: The Radiant Gorgeous Blooming Cherry Blossoms at Bandai Channel 

1999 anime OVAs
2000 anime OVAs
Bandai Visual
ADV Films
Works based on Sakura Wars

es:Sakura Taisen#Sakura Taisen: Gouka Kenran
fr:Sakura Wars
zh:櫻花大戰 櫻華絢爛